Micromonospora fluostatini is a bacterium from the genus Micromonospora which has been isolated from marine sediments from Panwa Cape, Phuket Province, Thailand. Micromonospora fluostatini produces the antibiotics fluostatin B and fluostatin C

References

 

Micromonosporaceae
Bacteria described in 2015